In a Courtyard, Tangier is a late 19th-century painting by French artist Philippe Pavy. Done in oil on wood, the work depicts a young woman resting in a Tangerian courtyard. The painting was one of a series of paintings Pavy produced after he traveled in North Africa in the 1880s. It is currently in the collection of the Metropolitan Museum of Art.

References 

1886 paintings
Paintings in the collection of the Metropolitan Museum of Art